Chriss Rune Olsen Angvik (born 12 August 1988 in Molde, Norway) is a Norwegian musician (guitar and vocals) and composer, and known from the bands Red Hot and Envy, backing Nico & Vinz.

Career
Angvik started the R&B band Red Hot together with friends from Romsdal in 2006. In 2008 they were invited to play together with Vidar Busk at the international festival Moldejazz, where they have performed each year thereafter.

He won the final of the Emergenza festival 2011, with the band Envy (Nico & Vinz). Residing in Oslo, Angvik led his own band Chemical Music.

Honors 
2011: Emergenza festival winner within the band Envy (Nico & Vinz)

Discography
With Red Hot
2008: Hotter Than Georgia Asphalt (Bluesnews Records)
2010: My Arrival EP (Bluesnews Records)

With Envy alias Nico & Vinz
2012: The Magic Soup and the Bittersweet Faces (Universal Music Group)
2014: Black Star Elephant (Warner Bros. Records)

References

External links 

Red Hot Website

Norwegian rock guitarists
Norwegian male composers
Musicians from Molde
1988 births
Living people
21st-century Norwegian singers
21st-century Norwegian guitarists
21st-century Norwegian male singers